David Ewart Essenhigh (born 31 July 1936) is a former English cricketer.  Essenhigh was a right-handed batsman who bowled right-arm medium pace.  He was born at Folkestone, Kent.

Essenhigh made his Minor Counties Championship debut for Wiltshire in 1958 against the Somerset Second XI.  From 1958 to 1971, he represented the county in 48 Minor Counties Championship matches, the last of which came against Berkshire.

Essenhigh also represented Wiltshire in 2 List A matches against Nottinghamshire in the 1965 Gillette Cup and Essex in the 1969 Gillette Cup.  In his 2 List A matches, he scored 20 runs at a batting average of 10.00 and a high score of 19.

References

External links
David Essenhigh at Cricinfo
David Essenhigh at CricketArchive

1936 births
Living people
People from Folkestone
English cricketers
Wiltshire cricketers